Judith Shamian is an Irish nurse. She served as president of the International Council of Nurses (ICN) from 2013-2017.

Career 
She was elected to the position at ICN's May 2013 Quadrennial Congress in Melbourne, Australia. She was also the president of the Victorian Order of Nurses (VON) and the Canadian Nurses Association (CNA) respectively. She was succeeded as president by Annette Kennedy in 2017.

She was also vice president of Nursing at Mount Sinai Hospital in Toronto and has also served in consulting, expert advisory, and research-oriented positions in nursing. Furthermore, she is a professor at the Lawrence S. Bloomberg Faculty of Nursing at the University of Toronto. Her international consulting assignments include work in China, Barbados, the British Virgin Islands, Hungary, the United States, Israel, and, Botswana at the University of Botswana.

Shamian has published and spoken extensively, nationally and internationally on nursing-related topics. She obtained her PhD from the Case Western Reserve, Cleveland, Ohio, a Master in Public Health from New York University, and a Baccalaureate in Community Nursing from Concordia University in Montreal.

Bibliography 
 
 Judith Shamian (April 23, 2010). Becoming a Nursing Leader: An interview with Judith     Shamian. Nursing Ideas.

References

External links 
 https://www.imdb.com/title/tt2822452/characters/nm10009005
 https://ca.linkedin.com/in/judith-shamian-20031ba
 https://bloomberg.nursing.utoronto.ca/research/distinctions/american-academy-nursing/attachment/judith-shamian/

Notes
· McCann, Wendy (June 5, 1998). "Nurses determine quality of care: poll". The Record. Kitchener, Ontario.

· · "Judith Shamian's Publications". Victoria Order of Nurses. Archived from the original on April 29, 2011.

· · "Judith Shamian's Presentations as CEO of VON". Victoria Order of Nurses. Archived from the original on April 29, 2011.

Living people
Canadian nurses
Canadian women nurses
Fellows of the American Academy of Nursing
Nursing researchers
Nursing educators
Year of birth missing (living people)